In the theory of Lie groups, the exponential map is a map from the Lie algebra  of a Lie group  to the group, which allows one to recapture the local group structure from the Lie algebra. The existence of the exponential map is one of the primary reasons that Lie algebras are a useful tool for studying Lie groups.

The ordinary exponential function of mathematical analysis is a special case of the exponential map when  is the multiplicative group of positive real numbers (whose Lie algebra is the additive group of all real numbers). The exponential map of a Lie group satisfies many properties analogous to those of the ordinary exponential function, however, it also differs in many important respects.

Definitions
Let  be a Lie group and  be its Lie algebra (thought of as the tangent space to the identity element of ). The exponential map is a map

which can be defined in several different ways. The typical modern definition is this:

It follows easily from the chain rule that . That the integral curve exists for all real parameters follows by right- or left-translating the solution near zero.

We have a more concrete definition in the case of a matrix Lie group. The exponential map coincides with the matrix exponential and is given by the ordinary series expansion:
 ,
where  is the identity matrix.

Comparison with Riemannian exponential map
If G is compact, it has a Riemannian metric invariant under left and right translations, and the Lie-theoretic exponential map for G coincides with the exponential map of this Riemannian metric.

For a general G, there will not exist a Riemannian metric invariant under both left and right translations. Although there is always a Riemannian metric invariant under, say, left translations, the exponential map in the sense of Riemannian geometry for a left-invariant metric will not in general agree with the exponential map in the Lie group sense. That is to say, if G is a Lie group equipped with a left- but not right-invariant metric, the geodesics through the identity will not be one-parameter subgroups of G .

Other definitions
Other equivalent definitions of the Lie-group exponential are as follows:
 It is the exponential map of a canonical left-invariant affine connection on G, such that parallel transport is given by left translation. That is,  where  is the unique geodesic with the initial point at the identity element and the initial velocity X (thought of as a tangent vector).
 It is the exponential map of a canonical right-invariant affine connection on G. This is usually different from the canonical left-invariant connection, but both connections have the same geodesics (orbits of 1-parameter subgroups acting by left or right multiplication) so give the same exponential map.

Examples
 The unit circle centered at 0 in the complex plane is a Lie group (called the circle group) whose tangent space at 1 can be identified with the imaginary line in the complex plane,  The exponential map for this Lie group is given by
 
that is, the same formula as the ordinary complex exponential.

 More generally, for complex toruspg 8  for some integral lattice  of rank  (so isomorphic to ) the torus comes equipped with a universal covering map

from the quotient by the lattice.
 In the quaternions , the set of quaternions of unit length form a Lie group (isomorphic to the special unitary group ) whose tangent space at 1 can be identified with the space of purely imaginary quaternions,  The exponential map for this Lie group is given by
 
Exponential of a Pauli vector). Compare this to the first example above.
 Let V be a finite dimensional real vector space and view it as a Lie group under the operation of vector addition. Then  via the identification of V with its tangent space at 0, and the exponential map

is the identity map, that is, .
 In the split-complex number plane  the imaginary line  forms the Lie algebra of the unit hyperbola group  since the exponential map is given by

Properties

Elementary properties of the exponential
It follows that:
 
 

More generally:
 .

It is important to emphasize that the preceding identity does not hold in general; the assumption that  and  commute is important.

The exponential near the identity
The exponential map  is a smooth map. Its differential at zero, is the identity map (with the usual identifications).

It is then not difficult to show that if G is connected, every element g of G is a product of exponentials of elements of :.

Globally, the exponential map is not necessarily surjective. Furthermore, the exponential map may not be a local diffeomorphism at all points. For example, the exponential map from (3) to SO(3) is not a local diffeomorphism; see also cut locus on this failure. See derivative of the exponential map for more information.

Surjectivity of the exponential
In these important special cases, the exponential map is known to always be surjective:
 G is connected and compact,
 G is connected and nilpotent (for example, G connected and abelian), and
 .

For groups not satisfying any of the above conditions, the exponential map may or may not be surjective.

The image of the exponential map of the connected but non-compact group SL2(R) is not the whole group. Its image consists of C-diagonalizable matrices with eigenvalues either positive or with modulus 1, and of non-diagonalizable matrices with a repeated eigenvalue 1, and the matrix .

Exponential map and homomorphisms
Let  be a Lie group homomorphism and let  be its derivative at the identity. Then the following diagram commutes:

In particular, when applied to the adjoint action of a Lie group , since , we have the useful identity:
 .

Logarithmic coordinates 
Given a Lie group  with Lie algebra , each choice of a basis  of  determines a coordinate system near the identity element e for G, as follows. Its inverse:

is then a coordinate system on U. It is called by various names such as logarithmic coordinates, exponential coordinates or normal coordinates. See the closed-subgroup theorem for an example of how they are used in applications.

Remark: The open cover  gives a structure of a real-analytic manifold to G such that the group operation  is real-analytic.

See also
 List of exponential topics
 Derivative of the exponential map
 Matrix exponential

Citations

Works cited

.
.
.
 

Lie algebras
Lie groups